Pico Polaco is a mountain located in Argentina with a height of . It is located at Calingasta Department, San Juan Province, at the Cordillera de la Ramada.

Location

It is located at Calingasta Department, San Juan Province, at the Cordillera de la Ramada. The name was given to the peak following the first ascent, after the Polish climbers (who were the first explorers) in honor of their achievements within the Cordillera de la Ramada. The Polish expedition referred to the mountain as Innominata ("Unnamed").

Elevation

It has an official height of 5965 meters Based on the elevation provided by the available Digital elevation models, SRTM (5936m), SRTM2 (5920m), ASTER (5913m), SRTM filled with ASTER (5920m), TanDEM-X(5827m),  Pico Polaco is about 5950 meters above sea level.

The height of the nearest key col is 5455 meters, so its prominence is 495 meters. Pico Polaco is listed as mountain, based on the Dominance system  and its dominance is 8.32%. Its parent peak is La Mesa and the topographic isolation is 4 kilometers. This information was obtained during a research by Suzanne Imber in 2014.

First ascent
The first attempt to climb the mountain was by a Polish expedition in 1934, abandoned due to bad weather and one of the team members' foot injury. The first successful ascent was done in 1958 by Argentine climbers A. Beorchia and E. Yacante.

Notes

External links
Elevation information about Pico Polaco
Weather Forecast at Pico Polaco

See also
List of mountains in the Andes

Mountains of Argentina